The Parting Tide is a studio album by Nightnoise. The album was released by Windham Hill Records (WD-1097) in 1990.

Track listing 

 "Bleu" by Brian Dunning (4:56)   
 "An Irish Carol" by Tríona Ní Dhomhnaill (8:00)   
 "Jig of Sorts" by Tríona Ní Dhomhnaill (3:29)   
 "Through the Castle Garden" by Tríona Ní Dhomhnaill (2:52)   
 "Island of Hope and Tears" by Tríona Ní Dhomhnaill (4:45)   
 "The Kid in the Cot" by Brian Dunning (6:05)   
 "The Tryst" by Billy Oskay (4:23)   
 "Snow Is Lightly Falling" by Tríona Ní Dhomhnaill (3:55)   
 "The Abbot" by Mícheál Ó Domhnaill (7:41)

Credits 

 Billy Oskay – violin, viola, keyboards, recording supervisor, mixing 
 Mícheál Ó Domhnaill – guitar, whistle, keyboards, vocals, producer
 Tríona Ní Dhomhnaill – vocals, piano, keyboards, whistle, accordion
 Brian Dunning – flute, alto flute, panpipes, panflute 
 Brian Willis – cymbal (8)  
 Mark Boddeker – mastering supervisor  
 Bernie Grundman – mastering  
 Anne Robinson – art direction  
 Erv Schroeder – photography (front cover)
 Irene Young – photography 
 Notes Published by Nightnoise Music (BMI)/Windham Hill Music (BMI)
 Recorded at Nightnoise Studios, Portland, OR 
 Mastered at Bernie Grundman Mastering, Hollywood, CA

References 

1990 albums
Nightnoise albums